Friendly Fire is a charity event by German YouTubers and streamers on the live streaming service Twitch. It takes place once a year since 2015 on the first Saturday in December. There was one special on April 12, 2020, collecting money for victims of the COVID-19 pandemic. The most recent stream was on December 4, 2021. Each stream is around 12h long and consists of a series of games and challenges. Friendly Fire collected a total of over 6.5 Million € (7 Million US$) in donation money from viewers and sponsors. The money gets split equally between each years charities.

Friendly Fire 8 will be on December 3, 2022, at 3pm CET.

The event won several awards, including the German computer games award in 2018.

Donations

References 

Charity events
Twitch (service)
Internet broadcasting
Annual events
Livestreams